The Journal of Southern African Studies is an international publication which covers research on the Southern African region, focussing on Angola, Botswana, Eswatini, Lesotho, Malawi, Mozambique, Namibia, South Africa, Zambia, and Zimbabwe, and occasionally also Tanzania, the Democratic Republic of Congo, Madagascar, and Mauritius.

References 

Political science journals
Publications established in 1975
English-language journals
Quarterly journals
Taylor & Francis academic journals
African studies journals